Karine Hervieu (born 24 February 1982) is a French athlete who is a specialist in the javelin throw. First competing for club EA Louviers, she left the club for CA Montreuil 93 in 2006. She trains at the same time as she is coach of the youth throwers of the club.

Karine's best national result was a first place at the 2009 French National Winter Championships. She was a bronze medallist at the 2005 Jeux de la Francophonie

International competitions

National titles
French Winter Throwing Championships
Javelin throw: 2009

Personal records

References

External links
 

1982 births
Living people
French female javelin throwers
20th-century French women
21st-century French women